Pat O'Connor is an Irish hurling referee.  A native of Limerick he is regarded as one of the sport's top referees and has officiated at several All-Ireland finals in minor, under-21 and senior levels.

References

 Donegan, Des, The Complete Handbook of Gaelic Games (DBA Publications Limited, 2005).

Year of birth missing (living people)
Living people
Hurling referees
Sportspeople from Limerick (city)